Tom Oliver (born 12 June 1938) is a British-born Australian retired actor who started his career in theatre in his native country, before emigrating to Australia.

Oliver, a staple of the small screen since the early 1960s, is best known for his TV soap opera roles, most especially Neighbours as Lou Carpenter, a role he played for 25 years. The character was known for his constant sparring with Harold Bishop, and his trademark dirty laugh, which he previously utilised in an earlier role on Number 96. Oliver has stated that it was inspired by the comic actor Sid James.

He appeared in the early Crawford Productions police procedurals, before having the soap opera roles in Bellbird, as Tom Grey and in Number 96 as Jack Sellers.

Short term soap roles included Prisoner, Sons and Daughters and A Country Practice.

Biography

Early life

Oliver was born in Chandler's Ford, Hampshire, England and started appearing in amateur theatricals as an adolescent in Britain before pursuing a career as a jockey. However, he failed to gain an apprenticeship owing to his size.

British Navy
He joined the Merchant Navy at 16 and travelled the world, eventually settling in Sydney in 1956. Whilst in the British Forces, he worked  on the Pacific Nuclear Testing Base, Christmas Island and so is a member of the British Nuclear Test Veterans Association.

Career

Early career

While in Australia, Oliver found work as a stockman, spending three years in this job, working his way around the country. He subsequently returned to the UK before beginning an overland trek across Asia to return to Australia. However, the journey was halted by illness and Oliver returned to Britain where he contacted Albert Finney who was then planning to produce the film Ned Kelly in Australia in 1963. Finney gave him a letter of introduction to an agency in Sydney and Oliver emigrated in 1963, later becoming an Australian citizen. He frequently visits Fareham, Hampshire to see his old friends. 

Oliver became a busy theatre and television actor in Australia. He had many guest starring roles on Australian drama series, appearing frequently in the top-rated Crawford Productions police dramas Homicide, Division 4, Matlock Police, and in Crawford's adventure series Hunter (1967).

Oliver was then cast in serial Bellbird, playing the role of Tom Grey from 1969 to 1971, and appeared in the 1971 film Nickel Queen, directed by John McCallum. After this he returned to television guest roles for Crawfords, and other companies. He also appeared in several British TV series at the beginning of the 70's, such as Paul Temple, Thirty Minute Theatre, and also played two roles in the Gerry Anderson series UFO – a doctor in the episode entitled "Confetti Check A-OK" as well as a SHADO technician in the episode entitled "The Sound of Silence".

Oliver also served a stint as a presenter on Play School in 1967.

Number 96
In 1972 he joined the cast of fledgling soap opera Number 96 playing the role of Janie Somers' new beau Jack Sellars. Back-slapping rough diamond Jack, nicknamed "Jolly Jack Sellars" was intended as a guest character to appear for a run of just three weeks, but the makers of the show were impressed with his performance and the character was made into an ongoing lead regular in the serial.

Oliver became one of the Number 96s most popular cast members. During his run in the show he married fellow Number 96 actress Lynn Rainbow, who played Sonia Vansard and opened a wine bar in Kensington, Sydney cunningly named Jack's Cellar. In late 1973, along with much of the show's regular cast including Rainbow, he reprised his television role in a feature film spinoff of the serial, also called Number 96. Oliver stayed in the role in the series for more than two years, finally electing to leave in mid-1974. He quickly returned to guest starring roles on television and film roles of varying sizes. He briefly returned to Number 96 in the role of Jack Sellars in September 1975. He has been married to his current wife Jan Oliver since 1985. Whilst acting on Neighbours, he owned a Maltese Shitzu called Lou. He is a keen gardener and mountain fisher.

Television and miniseries and stage

Oliver's film roles included ABBA: The Movie (1977). His primary role in the film is as ABBA's gruff bodyguard; however, he additionally appears in the film as a barman and as a chatty moustached taxi driver shown mainly from behind. Through the late 1970s and the 1980s, Oliver appeared in guest and regular roles in many Australian drama series and serials, including Prisoner, Holiday Island, Cop Shop and Sons and Daughters. He also appeared in the acclaimed miniseries The Dismissal portraying Reg Withers. Oliver has been nominated for the Australian Film and Television Awards for Best Supporting Actor three times. Oliver also acted on the stage, appearing in such plays as The Knack, Cactus Flower, How the Other Half Loves and The Club.

Neighbours

Today Oliver is best known for his long-running role of Lou Carpenter in Neighbours. He first appeared for a handful of episodes as lovable rogue used-car salesman Lou, Madge Bishop's former flame, in 1988. In early 1992 the character was reintroduced to the series and was a key character until 2016. Oliver was written out of the show in 1996 but producers relented after numerous petitions from fans and he was quickly reintroduced. By 2009, he was the show's longest serving character, both in continuous and overall duration. From the 2009 season, Oliver reduced his role on Neighbours to a part-time regular member of the cast. Oliver appeared in a documentary special celebrating the show's 30th anniversary titled Neighbours 30th: The Stars Reunite, which aired in Australia and the UK in March 2015. In 2015, it was announced that Oliver had cut back further on his role as Lou and would only appear from time to time as a guest.  In October 2016 it was announced that Oliver had quit the role after 24 years and his last appearance aired in December 2016.

Lou did not feature in the series finale, but there was still a reference to his character in the form of a lawyers' office called "T Oliver". Executive producer Jason Herbison later revealed that he had personally called Oliver to inquire about returning for the final episode, but Oliver turned it down as he was "at a different point in his life now".

Filmography

Appearances (as himself)

Producer

References

External links 
 
 Tom Oliver as Lou Carpenter

1938 births
Living people
Australian male film actors
Australian male soap opera actors
Australian male stage actors
British Merchant Navy personnel
Australian children's television presenters
British children's television presenters
English emigrants to Australia
English male film actors
English male soap opera actors
English male stage actors
English television presenters
People from Chandler's Ford
20th-century Australian male actors
20th-century English male actors
21st-century Australian male actors
21st-century English male actors
People with acquired Australian citizenship